Ralph Gomes (born 13 June 1937 in Uitvlugt; died 16 March 2020) was a track and field athlete from Guyana. He competed in the middle-distances, and represented his native country at the 1960 Summer Olympics in Rome, Italy.

References
sports-reference

1937 births
2020 deaths
Guyanese male middle-distance runners
Afro-Guyanese people
Athletes (track and field) at the 1958 British Empire and Commonwealth Games
Commonwealth Games competitors for British Guiana
Athletes (track and field) at the 1959 Pan American Games
Pan American Games competitors for British Guiana
Athletes (track and field) at the 1960 Summer Olympics
Olympic athletes of British Guiana
Central American and Caribbean Games gold medalists for Guyana
Central American and Caribbean Games silver medalists for Guyana
Central American and Caribbean Games bronze medalists for Guyana
Competitors at the 1959 Central American and Caribbean Games
Competitors at the 1962 Central American and Caribbean Games
Central American and Caribbean Games medalists in athletics